Hugues Aubriot (born 13XX in Dijon; died c. 1391 in Dijon) was a French administrator and heretic. Aubriot was Provost of Paris under Charles V. He built the Bastille in 1370-1383. He was a capable administrator who built the first sewers in Paris, and strengthened the City's fortifications.    He was on very poor terms with both the Church, and the University of Paris, which was dominated by the Clergy.   During the course of disturbances, in Paris, after the death of Charles V in 1380, he arrested citizens who had harassed the City's Jews.  For this, he was placed on trial, and a variety of trumped up charges were brought against him, including heresy, sodomy, and extortion.  However, he was a strong supporter of Philip the Bold, Duke of Burgundy, who was able to prevent him from being executed.  He was instead, sentenced to life imprisonment on bread and water.  In subsequent disturbances in Paris, he was released by a mob who were rioting against excessive taxation, and sought his support.  Prudently, he took the opportunity to flee from the City.

See also
Paris Sewer Museum

People from Dijon
14th-century French people
1382 deaths
Year of birth unknown